Steele County is a county in the U.S. state of Minnesota. As of the 2020 census, the population was 37,406. Its county seat is Owatonna.

Steele County comprises the Owatonna Micropolitan Statistical Area.

History
The county was created by the Minnesota Territory legislature on February 20, 1855, using areas partitioned from Rice, Blue Earth, and Le Sueur counties. Owatonna, the settlement of which had commenced in 1854, was named the county seat. The county was named for Franklin Steele, a prominent early resident of the territory.

Geography

The Straight River rises in Freeborn County and flows northward through the central part of Steele County, continuing into Rice County on the north. The South Branch of the Middle Fork of the Zumbro River rises in Steele County and flows eastward into Dodge County. The county terrain consists of low rolling hills, etched with drainages, completely devoted to agriculture where possible. The terrain slopes to the east and north, with its highest point near the midpoint of its south border, at  ASL.

The Straight River flows northward through the county, and the Le Sueur River flows through its southwestern corner. The Middle Fork of the Zumbro River rises in NE Steele County.

Major highways
  Interstate 35 – runs north–south through west-central portion of county. Passes Medford, Clinton Falls, Owatonna, Hope and Ellendale.
  U.S. Route 14 – runs east–west through upper central portion of county; passes Owatonna.
  U.S. Route 218 – runs north-northwest from southeast corner of county to intersection with US 14, southeast of Owatonna.
  Minnesota State Highway 30 – runs east–west across south part of county; passes Ellendale.

Airports
 Owatonna Degner Regional Airport (OWA) - northwest of Owatonna

Adjacent counties

 Rice – north
 Dodge – east
 Mower – southeast
 Freeborn – south
 Waseca – west

Protected areas

 Aurora State Wildlife Management Area
 Oak Glen State Wildlife Management Area
 Rice Lake State Park
 Somerset State Wildlife Management Area
 Swan Lake State Wildlife Management Area

Lakes

 Beaver
 Fosilen
 Kohlmeier
 Lonergan
 Oak Glen
 Rice (part)
 Rickert
 Swan

Demographics

2000 census

As of the 2000 census, there were 33,680 people, 12,846 households, and 9,082 families in the county. The population density was 78.3/sqmi (30.2/km2). There were 13,306 housing units at an average density of 30.9/sqmi (11.9/km2). The racial makeup of the county was 95.19% White, 1.07% Black or African American, 0.10% Native American, 0.85% Asian, 0.02% Pacific Islander, 1.65% from other races, and 1.12% from two or more races. 3.76% of the population were Hispanic or Latino of any race. 38.6% were of German, 18.5% Norwegian, 5.2% Czech and 5.1% Irish ancestry.

There were 12,846 households, out of which 35.50% had children under the age of 18 living with them, 59.50% were married couples living together, 7.40% had a female householder with no husband present, and 29.30% were non-families. 24.60% of all households were made up of individuals, and 10.30% had someone living alone who was 65 years of age or older. The average household size was 2.57 and the average family size was 3.08.

The county population contained 27.90% under the age of 18, 8.20% from 18 to 24, 29.00% from 25 to 44, 21.60% from 45 to 64, and 13.30% who were 65 years of age or older. The median age was 36 years. For every 100 females, there were 97.50 males. For every 100 females age 18 and over, there were 95.00 males.

The median income for a household in the county was $46,106, and the median income for a family was $53,981. Males had a median income of $36,366 versus $25,054 for females. The per capita income for the county was $20,328. About 4.20% of families and 6.20% of the population were below the poverty line, including 7.10% of those under age 18 and 7.10% of those age 65 or over.

2020 census

Communities

Cities

 Blooming Prairie (partly in Dodge County)
 Ellendale
 Medford
 Owatonna (county seat)

Unincorporated communities

 Bixby
 Clinton Falls
 Deerfield
 Havana
 Hope
 Lemond
 Litomysl
 Meriden
 Merton
 Moland
 Pratt
 Saco
 Steele Center

Ghost town
 Rice Lake

Townships

 Aurora
 Berlin
 Blooming Prairie
 Clinton Falls
 Deerfield
 Havana
 Lemond
 Medford
 Meriden
 Merton
 Owatonna
 Somerset
 Summit

Politics
Steele County voters have traditionally voted Republican. In only one national election since 1964 has the county selected the Democratic Party candidate.

See also
 National Register of Historic Places listings in Steele County, Minnesota

References

External links
 Steele County government's website
 Steele County Historical Society
 City of Owatonna
 City of Medford
 City of Blooming Prairie
 City of Ellendale
 Rice Lake State Park

 
Minnesota counties
1855 establishments in Minnesota Territory
Populated places established in 1855